Shelley is a suburb of Perth, Western Australia, located within the City of Canning.

History
The suburb was part of Riverton until the mid-1960s; its name is believed to refer to shells found in the area on the shores of the Canning River.

Boundary
The suburb's northern foreshore is bound by Riverton Drive North. In the east, the borders starts from Riverton Drive East, Barbican Street East, Tudor avenue South, Tribute Street, Modillion Avenue, Corinthian Road East.

A stretch of Leach Highway forms the south western border of the suburb until it goes up to Fifth Avenue and zig zags up back to Riverton Drive North.

Education
Shelley has one primary school located within its borders, Shelley Primary School which is off Monota Avenue. Shelley is located within the Rossmoyne Senior High School zone and is close to Curtin University.

Shopping
Shelley contains a neighbourhood shopping centre called Shelley Hub that comprises a Post office and Newsagent, SK Cafe and Indian Restaurant, Shelley Fish n' Chips, Celebrations Liquor, Wizard Pharmacy, Shelley Dental, Phill Bean Korean Restaurant, Kevin Baruffi & Associates, Shelley Chinese, Shelley Podiatrist, Shelley Hairdressers and Shelley Beauty Salon.

Transport
Shelley residents have access to major bus routes. Off Leach Highway the 998 and 999 CircleRoute buses travel to Fremantle and to Curtin University in the opposite direction respectively. Another bus service which Shelley residents have access to is the 170, which travels from Bull Creek Station to Elizabeth Quay Bus Station.

References

External links

Suburbs of Perth, Western Australia
Canning River (Western Australia)
Suburbs in the City of Canning